The Havre De Grace Police Department (HDGPD) is a full-service agency servicing the incorporated municipality of Havre De Grace, Maryland. Established in 1981, HDGPD is Havre De Grace's primary law enforcement agency.

Chief
The Chief is Teresa Walter.

Divisions
The department consists of the following divisions and specialized units:

 Administration
 Communications
 Criminal Investigations Division
 K-9 Unit
 Narcotics Task Force*
 Patrol
 SWAT*

*The Narcotics Task Force & SWAT Team are both multi-jurisdictional and composed of members from the Havre De Grace Police Department and other local police agencies.

Rank structure and insignia

References

External links
 Official Website

Harford County, Maryland
Municipal police departments of Maryland